Sandra Pérez-Ramos (born San Juan, Puerto Rico) is a Puerto Rican visual artist currently residing and working out of the Greater Washington, D.C. area. Pérez-Ramos  earned a BA in Visual Arts for Public Communication in 1997 from the School of Communication at the University of Puerto Rico, Río Piedras campus.

Work 
Pérez-Ramos describes her latest works as Neo-Folk. Her mixed media works were included in three photography biennials in Cuba and Puerto Rico, and her fiber arts and drawings in multiple exhibitions throughout the US.

In 2020 her work was described by art critic Lennox Campello: "Her artistic pedigree is evident in her gifted use of color and form to deliver highly stylized imagery, which over the years has grown into one of the hardest achievements in the art world: a completely distinct style and ritual."

In 2022, one of her works was selected as the finalist for a major Maryland Park Public Art Project.

She was the co-founder and vice-president of former The Latino Art League of Greater Washington DC, and the former Membership Chair at the Montgomery Art Association.

Solo shows 
2014 Montgomery Art Association Gallery. Wheaton, Maryland
2015 Rare Plants and Lunatics Art Show at Bethesda Regional Library, Bethesda, Maryland
2017 Featured artist at Gallery 209. Artists & Makers Studios 2, Rockville, Maryland
2017 Textiles and Lunatics: Constructing Dreams at Merge Gallery. Artists & Makers Studios 2, Rockville, Maryland
2018 SVN Wright Commercial. Rockville, Maryland

Selected group shows 
1998 Certámen de Fotografía del Centro de Estudiantes. Universidad de Puerto Rico, Río Piedras, Puerto Rico, Puerto Rico
1998 III Bienal Internacional de Fotografía de La Llave del Cerro. Centro Cultural, Havana, Cuba.
1998 Primera Bienal Internacional de Fotografía de Puerto Rico. Museo del Arsenal de la Puntilla, San Juan, Puerto Rico
2000 , San Juan, Puerto Rico
2002 III Bienal Internacional de Fotografía de Puerto Rico. Museo del Arsenal de la Puntilla, San Juan, Puerto Rico
2008 Inner Noise. Caladan Gallery, Boston, Massachusetts
2008 Small Works Show. The Chait Galleries Downtown, Iowa City, Iowa
2009 Art Raw Inaugural in New York. Art Raw Gallery, New York City, New York
2008–2009 The Sketchbook Project III, Art House Gallery, Atlanta, Georgia. Itinerant show through museums and galleries at Georgia, District of Columbia, Pennsylvania, Massachusetts, Illinois, and New York. Including the Museum of Contemporary Art in D.C., 3rd Ward Brooklyn in Brooklyn, Museum of Design Atlanta, Georgia.
2009 National Fiber Directions 2009. The Wichita Center for the Arts, Wichita, Kansas
2012–2013 International Juried Photography Exhibit 2012. 1212 Gallery, Richmond, Virginia
2014 A Toast to Fall by Phillips Programs. Artisphere, Arlington, Virginia
2014 FonFoto: Juried Mobile Phone Photo Exhibit. The Petaluma Arts Center, Petaluma, California
2014 Montgomery Art Association Gallery, Wheaton, MD
2016 Crossroads: Magic + Matter. Betty Mae Kramer Gallery. Silver Spring, Maryland
2016 Fiber Options: Material Explorations. Circle Gallery-Maryland Federation of Art, Annapolis, Maryland
2016 Magic and Color. Torpedo Factory, Alexandria, Virginia
2017 Gallery 209, Rockville, Maryland
2018 Fiber Options Exhibition. Circle Gallery- Maryland Federation of Art, Annapolis, Maryland
2018 Our Latin Roots/"Nuestras Raíces Latinas" PG County's Hispanic Heritage Month Celebration. Publick Playhouse. Cheverly, Maryland. By invitation
2018 Inspired By Frida Exhibition. Artists & Makers Studios 2. Rockville, Maryland
2019 Paint the Town Labor Day Show, Montgomery Art Association, Maryland (Second Prize winner)
2021 Connection as a Cornerstone to a Strong Community mural, Wheaton, MD.
2022 Languages of Fiber, The Goldman Gallery, Washington, DC.

References

External links 
Sandra Perez-Ramos Website
Interview in TELEMUNDO

Living people
20th-century American women artists
21st-century American women artists
Artists from Washington, D.C.
People from San Juan, Puerto Rico
People from Washington, D.C.
Year of birth missing (living people)
Puerto Rican women artists
Puerto Rican artists
Artists from Maryland